Al Cohn (November 24, 1925 – February 15, 1988) was an American jazz saxophonist, arranger and composer. He came to prominence in the band of clarinetist Woody Herman and was known for his longtime musical partnership with fellow saxophonist Zoot Sims.

Biography 
Alvin Gilbert Cohn was born in Brooklyn, New York.

In addition to his work as a jazz tenor saxophonist, Cohn was widely respected as an arranger. His work included the Broadway productions of Raisin and Sophisticated Ladies, and his arrangements of his own compositions were recorded by big bands led by Maynard Ferguson, Gerry Mulligan, Terry Gibbs and Bob Brookmeyer. Also, Cohn did arrangements for unreleased Linda Ronstadt recordings from the 1980s.

Cohn also appeared on stage with Elvis Presley in June, 1972, as a member of the Joe Malin Orchestra at Madison Square Garden.

Al Cohn died of liver cancer in Stroudsburg, Pennsylvania in 1988.

Cohn's first wife was singer Marilyn Moore. His son, Joe Cohn, is a jazz guitarist. Granddaughter Shaye Cohn, Joe's daughter, is a musician who plays cornet with her band Tuba Skinny in New Orleans and at jazz festivals in Italy, France, Australia, and elsewhere. Shaye also plays accordion, violin and piano.

Cohn was married to Flo Handy, a singer and composer, from the mid-1960s until his death.

 Discography 
 As leader/co-leader 
 Al Cohn's Tones (Savoy, 1950)
 East Coast-West Coast Scene (RCA Victor, 1954) split album with Shorty Rogers
 Mr. Music (RCA Victor, 1955)
 The Natural Seven (RCA Victor, 1955)
 That Old Feeling (RCA Victor, 1955)
 Four Brass One Tenor (RCA Victor, 1955)
 The Brothers! (RCA Victor, 1955) with Bill Perkins and Richie Kamuca
 From A to...Z (RCA Victor, 1956) The Al Cohn/Zoot Sims Sextet
 The Sax Section (Epic, 1956)
 Cohn on the Saxophone (Dawn, 1956)
 The Al Cohn Quintet Featuring Bobby Brookmeyer (Coral, 1956) – with Bob Brookmeyer
 The Four Brothers... Together Again! (Vik, 1957) with Serge Chaloff, Zoot Sims and Herbie Steward
 Al and Zoot (Coral, 1957) with Zoot Sims
 Jazz Alive! A Night at the Half Note (United Artists, 1959) with Zoot Sims and Phil Woods
 You 'n' Me (Mercury, 1960) – the Al Cohn/Zoot Sims Quintet
 Son of Drum Suite (RCA Victor, 1960)
 Either Way (Fred Miles Presents, 1961) with Zoot Sims
 Jazz Mission to Moscow (Colpix, 1962)
 Al & Zoot in London (World Records Club, 1965)
 Easy as Pie: Live at the West Bank (Label M, 1968) with Zoot Sims
 Body and Soul (Muse, 1973) with Zoot Sims
 Motoring Along (Sonet, 1974) with Zoot Sims
 Play It Now (Xanadu, 1975)
 True Blue (Xanadu, 1976) with Dexter Gordon
 Silver Blue (Xanadu, 1976) with Dexter Gordon
 Al Cohn's America (Xanadu, 1976)
 Heavy Love (Xanadu, 1977) with Jimmy Rowles
 No Problem (Xanadu, 1979)
 Xanadu in Africa (Xanadu, 1980 [1981]) with Billy Mitchell, Dolo Coker, Leroy Vinnegar and Frank Butler
 Night Flight to Dakar (Xanadu, 1980 [1982]) with Billy Mitchell, Dolo Coker, Leroy Vinnegar and Frank Butler
 Nonpareil (Concord, 1981) with Lou Levy, Monty Budwig, Jake Hanna
 Tour De Force (1981) live in Japan, with tenor players Buddy Tate and Scott Hamilton
 Standards of Excellence (Concord, 1984)
The Claw (Chiaroscuro, 1986) with Flip Philips
 Rifftide (Timeless, 1987) with Rein de Graaf (piano), Koos Serierse (bass), Eric Ineke (drums)

 As sideman With Manny Albam The Drum Suite (RCA Victor, 1956) with Ernie WilkinsWith Mose Allison Your Mind Is on Vacation (Atlantic, 1976)With Trigger Alpert Trigger Happy! (Riverside, 1956) also released as East Coast SoundsWith George Barnes Guitars Galore (Mercury, 1961)With Art Blakey Art Blakey Big Band (Bethlehem, 1957)With Bob Brookmeyer Bob Brookmeyer featuring Al Cohn (Storyville, 1954)
 Brookmeyer (Vik, 1956)
 Kansas City Revisited (United Artists, 1958)
 Stretching Out (United Artists, 1958) with Zoot Sims
 Portrait of the Artist (Atlantic, 1960)
 Gloomy Sunday and Other Bright Moments (Verve, 1961)With Kenny Burrell Earthy (1957, Prestige)
With Buck Clayton
How Hi the Fi (Columbia, 1954)
Jumpin' at the Woodside (Columbia, 1955)With Jimmy Giuffre The Music Man (Atlantic, 1958)With Freddie Green Mr. Rhythm (RCA Victor, 1955)With Urbie GreenAll About Urbie Green and His Big Band (ABC-Paramount, 1956)
With Coleman Hawkins
The Hawk in Hi Fi (RCA Victor, 1956)With Quincy JonesQuincy Plays for Pussycats (Mercury, 1959-65 [1965])With Jack Kerouac Blues and Haikus (1960)With Jimmy KnepperCunningbird (SteepleChase, 1976)With Mundell Lowe Satan in High Heels (Charlie Parker, 1961) soundtrackWith the Metronome All-Stars Metronome All-Stars 1956 (Clef, 1956) With Gary McFarland The Jazz Version of "How to Succeed in Business without Really Trying" (Verve, 1962)With Carmen McRae Birds of a Feather (Decca, 1958)With Gerry Mulligan The Gerry Mulligan Songbook (World Pacific, 1957)With Joe Newman All I Wanna Do Is Swing (RCA Victor, 1955)
 I'm Still Swinging (RCA Victor, 1955)
 Salute to Satch (RCA Victor, 1956)With Oscar Pettiford 
 Oscar Pettiford Sextet (Vogue, 1954)With Lalo Schifrin and Bob Brookmeyer Samba Para Dos (1963, Verve)

 As arranger With Maynard FergusonCome Blow Your Horn (Cameo, 1963) [1 track]With Astrud Gilberto Look to the Rainbow (Verve, 1966)With Quincy Jones The Birth of a Band! (Mercury, 1959)
 The Great Wide World of Quincy Jones (Mercury, 1959)With Irene KralThe Band and I (United Artists, 1958)
SteveIreneo! (United Artists, 1959)With Gerry Mulligan Holliday with Mulligan (DRG, 1961 [1980]) with Judy HollidayWith Mark Murphy That's How I Love the Blues! (Riverside, 1962)With Joe Newman The Happy Cats (Coral, 1957)With Herb Pomeroy'''The Band and I'' (United Artists, 1958) with Irene Kral

References

External links
 Al Cohn recordings at the Discography of American Historical Recordings.

1925 births
1988 deaths
American jazz saxophonists
American male saxophonists
Bebop saxophonists
Mainstream jazz saxophonists
Cool jazz saxophonists
Jewish American musicians
Savoy Records artists
Red Baron Records artists
RCA Records artists
Vee-Jay Records artists
Muse Records artists
Prestige Records artists
Timeless Records artists
Xanadu Records artists
Gemini Records artists
Musicians from Brooklyn
Erasmus Hall High School alumni
20th-century American musicians
Jewish jazz musicians
20th-century saxophonists
Jazz musicians from New York (state)
20th-century American male musicians
American male jazz musicians